A soft core (also called softcore) is a digital circuit that can be wholly implemented using logic synthesis.  It can be implemented via different semiconductor devices containing programmable logic (e.g., ASIC, FPGA, CPLD), including both high-end and commodity variations. Many soft cores may be implemented in one FPGA.
In those multi-core systems, rarely used resources can be shared between all the cores.

Examples of soft core implementations are soft microprocessors, graphics chips like AGA or Open Graphics Project, harddisc controllers etc.

See also 
 SoC (System-on-a-chip)
 PSoC (Programmable System on a Chip)
 FPGA (Field-programmable gate array)
 Reconfigurable computing
 Minimig - Example implementation of custom chips replications
 Open-source hardware
 List of open source hardware projects

References

External links 
 Microprocessor cores on Opencores.org (Expand the "Processor" tab)

Open hardware electronic devices